The 1821 Connecticut gubernatorial election was held on April 12, 1821. Incumbent governor and Toleration Party candidate Oliver Wolcott Jr. was re-elected, winning with 86.91% of the vote.

General election

Candidates
Major candidates

Oliver Wolcott Jr., Toleration

Minor candidates

Timothy Pitkin, Federalist
Nathan Smith, Federalist

Results

References

1821
Connecticut
Gubernatorial